Conrad J. Aumann (September 17, 1933 – December 23, 2006) was an American football, baseball, and softball coach.  He served as the head football coach at Concordia University Chicago from 1964 to 1982, compiling a record of 70–87–5.  He was also the head baseball coach at Concordia from 1966 to 1979, tallying a mark of 125–127–3.

Aumann was born on September 17, 1933 in Detroit, Michigan.  He died at the Bethesda Home in Chicago, Illinois on December 23, 2006.

References

1933 births
2006 deaths
American football quarterbacks
American softball coaches
Concordia Cougars athletic directors
Concordia Cougars baseball coaches
Concordia Cougars football coaches
Concordia Cougars softball coaches
Valparaiso Beacons baseball players
Valparaiso Beacons football players
Players of American football from Detroit
Baseball players from Detroit